Pseudorhaphitoma is a genus of sea snails, marine gastropod mollusks in the family Mangeliidae.

Description
This genus was originally described by Boettger as a section in the genus Clathurella.

The small, thick, monochrome brown or white, elongate shells are claviform. They contain 6 - 7 whorls. The prominent and continuous axial ribs are moderately strong. They are crossed regularly by numerous,  fine spiral lirae, producing granular or transverse plicules. The aperture measures about a third of the total length. The weakly notched siphonal canal is narrow and shallow. The sharp outer lip is denticulate on the inside and usually shows a particularly strong tooth close to the well-cut anal sinus. The columella occasionally carries 1-2 denticles.

Species
Species within the genus Pseudorhaphitoma include:

 Pseudorhaphitoma agna (Melvill & Standen, 1896)
 Pseudorhaphitoma albula (Thiele, 1925)
 Pseudorhaphitoma alfredi (E. A. Smith, 1904)
 Pseudorhaphitoma alma (Thiele, 1925)
 Pseudorhaphitoma alticostata (G.B. Sowerby III, 1896)
 Pseudorhaphitoma averina (Melvill & Standen, 1901)
 Pseudorhaphitoma axicula Hedley, 1922
 Pseudorhaphitoma bipyramidata Hedley, 1922
 Pseudorhaphitoma brionae (Sowerby III, 1888)
 Pseudorhaphitoma calcata (Hedley, 1909)
 Pseudorhaphitoma chocolata Stahlschmidt & E. Tardy, 2018
 Pseudorhaphitoma cognata (Thiele, 1925)
 Pseudorhaphitoma confortinii Bozzetti, 2007
 Pseudorhaphitoma crudelis Hedley, 1922
 Pseudorhaphitoma darnleyi (Brazier, 1876)
 Pseudorhaphitoma ditylota (Melvill, 1912)
 Pseudorhaphitoma drivasi Kilburn, 1993
 Pseudorhaphitoma epistomifer Kilburn, 1993
 Pseudorhaphitoma ethekwini Kilburn, 1993
 Pseudorhaphitoma fairbanki (G. Nevill & H. Nevill, 1875)
 Pseudorhaphitoma fortistriata (Smith E. A., 1888)
 Pseudorhaphitoma fuscescens (Thiele, 1925)
 Pseudorhaphitoma granilirata (Smith E. A., 1888)
 Pseudorhaphitoma heptagona (Dunker, 1871)
 Pseudorhaphitoma hexagonalis (Reeve, 1845)
 Pseudorhaphitoma ichthys (Melvill, 1910)
 Pseudorhaphitoma informis Hedley, 1922
 Pseudorhaphitoma iodolabiata (Hornung & Mermod, 1929)
 Pseudorhaphitoma jamesnacei Stahlschmidt & E. Tardy, 2018
 Pseudorhaphitoma jeantardyi Stahlschmidt & E. Tardy, 2018
 Pseudorhaphitoma kilburni Morassi & Bonfitto, 2001
 Pseudorhaphitoma mamillata (Smith E. A., 1888)
 Pseudorhaphitoma multigranosa (Schepman, 1913)
 Pseudorhaphitoma naganumaensis Otuka, 1935
 † Pseudoraphitoma nakosiensis Nomura & Zinbo, 1936 
 Pseudorhaphitoma obturata Kilburn, 1993
 Pseudorhaphitoma ornata Stahlschmidt & E. Tardy, 2018
 Pseudorhaphitoma paula (Thiele, 1925)
 Pseudorhaphitoma perlonga (Melvill, 1899)
 Pseudorhaphitoma perplexior Kilburn & Dekker, 2008
 Pseudorhaphitoma phaea (Melvill & Standen, 1901)
 Pseudorhaphitoma poppei Stahlschmidt & E. Tardy, 2018
 Pseudorhaphitoma pyramidalis (Reeve, 1846)
 Pseudorhaphitoma pyramidula (Laseron, 1954)
 Pseudorhaphitoma pyramis (Hinds, 1843)
 Pseudorhaphitoma scitula (Smith E. A., 1884)
 Pseudorhaphitoma severa (Thiele, 1925)
 Pseudorhaphitoma sienna Kilburn, 1993
 Pseudorhaphitoma stipendiarii Kilburn, 1993
 Pseudorhaphitoma styracina Hedley, 1922
 Pseudorhaphitoma tetragona (Gould, 1861)
 Pseudorhaphitoma thielei Kilburn, 1993
 Pseudorhaphitoma transitans Hedley, 1922
 Pseudorhaphitoma tropica (Thiele, 1925)
 Pseudorhaphitoma uncicostata Kilburn & Dekker, 2008
 Pseudorhaphitoma venusta (Morassi, 1994)

Species brought into synonymy
 Pseudorhaphitoma anna Thiele, J., 1925: synonym of Pseudorhaphitoma thielei Kilburn, 1993 
 Pseudorhaphitoma castellata (Smith E. A., 1888): synonym of Agathotoma castellata (E.A. Smith, 1888)
 Pseudorhaphitoma costata coarctata G.B. Sowerby, 1897: synonym of Pseudorhaphitoma alfredi (E.A. Smith, 1904)
 Pseudorhaphitoma misera K.H.J. Thiele, 1925: synonym of Pseudorhaphitoma alfredi (E.A. Smith, 1904)
 Pseudorhaphitoma maria K.H.J. Thiele, 1925: synonym of Pseudorhaphitoma ichthys (J.C. Melvill, 1910)
 Pseudorhaphitoma obeliscus L.A. Reeve, 1846: synonym of Pseudorhaphitoma pyramis (R.B. Hinds, 1843)

References

 Bouchet P., Kantor Yu.I., Sysoev A. & Puillandre N. (2011) A new operational classification of the Conoidea. Journal of Molluscan Studies 77: 273-308.

External links
 Smith, E.A. (1888) Diagnoses of new species of Pleurotomidae in the British Museum. Annals and Magazine of Natural History, series 6, 2, 300–317
 
 Worldwide Mollusc Species Data Base: Mangeliidae
 Kilburn, R. N. "Turridae (Mollusca: Gastropoda) of southern Africa and Mozambique. Part 7. Subfamily Mangeliinae, section 2." Annals of the Natal Museum 34.2 (1993): 317-367

 
Gastropod genera